Thiodina is a genus of jumping spiders that was first described by Eugène Louis Simon in 1900.

Species
Many former Thiodina species were transferred to the genus Colonus. T. inquies and T. irrorata are both considered nomen dubia.  it contains seven species:
Thiodina camilae Bustamante & Ruiz, 2020 – Dominican Republic
Thiodina firme Bustamante & Ruiz, 2017 – Brazil
Thiodina minuta (Galiano, 1977) – Peru
Thiodina nicoleti Roewer, 1951 (type) – Chile
Thiodina perian Bustamante & Ruiz, 2017 – Mexico
Thiodina tefyta Rubio, Baigorria & Stolar, 2023 – Argentina
Thiodina tyrioni Bustamante & Ruiz, 2020 – USA

References

External links
 Neotype of T. nicoleti

Salticidae genera
Salticidae
Spiders of South America